The 1925 Furman Purple Hurricane football team was an American football team that represented Furman University as a member of the Southern Intercollegiate Athletic Association (SIAA) during the 1925 college football season. In its 11th season under head coach Billy Laval, Furman compiled a 7–3 record (3–1 against SIAA opponents), finished in second place in the SIAA, was recognized as the South Carolina state champion, and outscored opponents by a total of 116 to 75. The team played its home games at Manly Field in Greenville, South Carolina.

Schedule

References

Furman
Furman Paladins football seasons
Furman Purple Hurricane football